{{DISPLAYTITLE:C10H16N2O3S}}
The molecular formula C10H16N2O3S (molar mass : 244.31 g/mol) may refer to :
 Amidephrine, an alpha-adrenergic agonist
 Biotin, a water-soluble B-complex vitamin